Which Way is East is a double CD album of duets by jazz saxophonist Charles Lloyd and percussionist Billy Higgins recorded in January 2001 and released in 2004 on the ECM label. The album contains the last recordings by Higgins before he died in May 2001.

Reception
In his "Jazz Consumer Guide" for The Village Voice, Tom Hull summarized the album as "two old friends converse, contemplate, fart around".

The Allmusic review by Thom Jurek awarded the album 4½ stars stating "there is crackling energy, humor, warmth, and a complete commitment to expressing what may indeed be beyond real expression. Not since John Coltrane and Rashied Ali's Interstellar Space — though they sound nothing alike — has there been a duet recording of such unfettered communication. Highly recommended". The All About Jazz review by John Kelman stated "While Higgins' passing, at the relatively youthful age of sixty-five, was tragic, we should feel fortunate that Lloyd had the foresight to bring him to his home in January 2001, for this series of impromptu, intimate and ultimately revealing duets". 
Other professional reviews for the same website were also highly favourable with Mark F. Turner stating "the music is a wondrous journey on many levels. Fervently recommended" Mark Corroto stated "The last recording by Higgins is worth savoring".

Track listing
All compositions by Charles Lloyd except as indicated
 "What Is Man: The Forest" (Higgins, Lloyd) - 3:34
 "What Is Man: Being and Becoming" - 4:45
 "What Is Man: Civilization" - 4:35
 "What Is Man: Sea of Tranquility" - 2:43
 "Divans: Prayer, Sanctuary" - 4:12
 "Divans: Supreme Love Dance" - 3:36
 "Divans: A Wild and Holy Band" - 3:53
 "Salaam: Oh, Karim" (Higgins) - 2:30
 "Salaam: Akhi" - 5:59
 "Salaam: Ya, Karim" (Higgins) - 5:54
 "Salaam: Tagi" - 4:15
 "All This Is That: Hanuman's Dance" - 13:06
 "All This Is That: Sky Valley" - 5:59
 "All This Is That: Blues Tinge" (Higgins) - 5:02
 "All This Is That: Atman Alone Abides" - 2:56
 "Desire: Wild Orchids Bloom" - 6:42
 "Desire: Advaita" - 3:35
 "Desire: Chomolungma" - 12:57
 "Devotion: Sally Sunflower Whitecloud" - 3:06
 "Devotion: My Lord, My Lord" (Higgins, Lloyd) - 6:11
 "Devotion: Windy Mountain" - 5:36
 "Devotion: Through Fields and Underground" - 3:48
 "Light of Love: Mi Corazon" - 3:24
 "Light of Love: Beloved, Chimes at Midnight" (Higgins, Lloyd) - 5:18
 "Light of Love: Take a Chance" (Higgins) - 4:04
 "Surrender: Perfume of the Desert" - 4:31
 "Surrender: Benares" - 2:21
 "Surrender: Amor" (Higgins) - 4:25
 "Surrender: Forever Dance" (Higgins, Lloyd) - 1:53
 "Surrender: Bis" (Higgins) - 3:44
Recorded in January 2001

Personnel
Charles Lloyd - tenor saxophone, alto saxophone, bass flute, alto flute, C flute, piano, tárogató, Tibetan oboe, percussion, maracas, voice
Billy Higgins - drums, percussion, guitar, guimbri, Syrian one string, various Senegalese and Guinean hand drums, Indian hand drum, Juno's wood box, voice
Manfred Eicher - executive producer

References

2004 albums
ECM Records albums
Charles Lloyd (jazz musician) albums
Billy Higgins albums